BS 8414 is a 2002 British Standard describing test methods to assess fire safety of cladding applied to the external face of a building. The latest version was issued in 2015.

The two-part standard describes methods for testing the cladding in two different setups, and has been ported to standards in countries such as Australia, Malaysia and the UAE.

Standard

Current
BS 8414-1:2015+A1:2017 Fire performance of external cladding systems. Test method for non-loadbearing external cladding systems applied to the masonry face of a building. Published on 30/04/2015 
BS 8414-2:2015+A1:2017 Fire performance of external cladding systems. Test method for non-loadbearing external cladding systems fixed to and supported by a structural steel frame. Published on 30/04/2015

Further reading 
 
 
  Google Drive view.
  Available online to download.

References

External links 
 2015 version of the Standard

08414